A neologism (from Greek νέο- néo(="new") and λόγος /lógos, meaning "speech, utterance") is a relatively recent or isolated term, word, or phrase that may be in the process of entering common use, but that has not been fully accepted into mainstream language. Neologisms are often driven by changes in culture and technology. In the process of language formation, neologisms are more mature than protologisms. A word whose development stage is between that of the protologism (freshly coined) and neologism (new word) is a prelogism.

Popular examples of neologisms can be found in science, fiction (notably science fiction), films and television, branding, literature, jargon, cant, linguistics, the visual arts, and popular culture.

Former examples include laser (1960) from Light Amplification by Stimulated Emission of Radiation; robot (1941) from Czech writer Karel Čapek's play R.U.R. (Rossum's Universal Robots); and agitprop (1930) (a portmanteau of "agitation" and "propaganda").

Background

Neologisms are often formed by combining existing words (see compound noun and adjective) or by giving words new and unique suffixes or prefixes. Neologisms can also be formed by blending words, for example, "brunch" is a blend of the words "breakfast" and "lunch", or through abbreviation or acronym, by intentionally rhyming with existing words or simply through playing with sounds. A relatively rare form of neologism is when proper names are used as words (e.g., boycott, from Charles Boycott), guy, Dick, and Karen.

Neologisms can become popular through memetics, through mass media, the Internet, and word of mouth, including academic discourse in many fields renowned for their use of distinctive jargon, and often become accepted parts of the language. Other times, they disappear from common use just as readily as they appeared. Whether a neologism continues as part of the language depends on many factors, probably the most important of which is acceptance by the public. It is unusual for a word to gain popularity if it does not clearly resemble other words.

History and meaning
The term neologism is first attested in English in 1772, borrowed from French néologisme (1734). In an academic sense, there is no professional Neologist, because the study of such things (cultural or ethnic vernacular, for example) is interdisciplinary. Anyone such as a lexicographer or an etymologist might study neologisms, how their uses span the scope of human expression, and how, due to science and technology, they spread more rapidly than ever before in the present times.

The term neologism has a broader meaning which also includes "a word which has gained a new meaning". Sometimes, the latter process is called semantic shifting, or semantic extension. Neologisms are distinct from a person's idiolect, one's unique patterns of vocabulary, grammar, and pronunciation.

Neologisms are usually introduced when it is found that a specific notion is lacking a term, or when the existing vocabulary lacks detail, or when a speaker is unaware of the existing vocabulary. The law, governmental bodies, and technology have a relatively high frequency of acquiring neologisms. Another trigger that motivates the coining of a neologism is to disambiguate a term which may be unclear due to having many meanings.

Literature

Neologisms may come from a word used in the narrative of fiction such as novels and short stories. Examples include "grok" (to intuitively understand) from the science fiction novel about a Martian entitled Stranger in a Strange Land by Robert A. Heinlein; "McJob" (precarious, poorly-paid employment) from Generation X: Tales for an Accelerated Culture by Douglas Coupland; "cyberspace" (widespread, interconnected digital technology) from Neuromancer by William Gibson and "quark" (Slavic slang for "rubbish"; German for a type of dairy product) from James Joyce's Finnegans Wake.

The title of a book may become a neologism, for instance, Catch-22 (from the title of Joseph Heller's novel). Alternatively, the author's name may give rise to the neologism, although the term is sometimes based on only one work of that author. This includes such words as "Orwellian" (from George Orwell, referring to his dystopian novel Nineteen Eighty-Four) and "Kafkaesque" (from Franz Kafka).

Names of famous characters are another source of literary neologisms (e.g., quixotic, referring to the romantic and misguided title character in Don Quixote by Miguel de Cervantes), scrooge (from the avaricious main character in Charles Dickens' A Christmas Carol) and pollyanna (from the unfailingly optimistic character in Eleanor H. Porter's book of the same name).

Cant

Polari is a cant used by some actors, circus performers, and the gay subculture to communicate without outsiders understanding. Some Polari terms have crossed over into mainstream slang, in part through their usage in pop song lyrics and other works. Example include: acdc, barney, blag, butch, camp, khazi, cottaging, hoofer, mince, ogle, scarper, slap, strides, tod, [rough] trade (rough trade).

Verlan, (verlan is the reverse of the expression "l'envers") is a type of argot in the French language, featuring inversion of syllables in a word, and is common in slang and youth language.  It rests on a long French tradition of transposing syllables of individual words to create slang words. Some verlan words, such as meuf ("femme", which means "woman" roughly backwards), have become so commonplace that they have been included in the Petit Larousse. Like any slang, the purpose of verlan is to create a somewhat secret language that only its speakers can understand. Words becoming mainstream is counterproductive. As a result, such newly common words are re-verlanised: reversed a second time. The common meuf became feumeu.

Popular culture 
Neologism development may be spurred, or at least spread, by popular culture. Examples of pop-culture neologisms include the American Alt-right (2010s), the Canadian portmanteau "Snowmageddon" (2009), the Russian parody "Monstration" (ca. 2004), Santorum (c. 2003).

Neologisms spread mainly through their exposure in mass media. The genericizing of brand names, such as "coke" for Coca-Cola, "kleenex" for Kleenex facial tissue, and "xerox" for Xerox photocopying, all spread through their popular use being enhanced by mass media.

However, in some limited cases, words break out of their original communities and spread through social media. "DoggoLingo", a term still below the threshold of a neologism according to Merriam-Webster, is an example of the latter which has specifically spread primarily through Facebook group and Twitter account use. The suspected origin of this way of referring to dogs stems from a Facebook group founded in 2008 and gaining popularity in 2014 in Australia. In Australian English it is common to use diminutives, often ending in –o, which could be where doggo-lingo was first used. The term has grown so that Merriam-Webster has acknowledged its use but notes the term needs to be found in published, edited work for a longer period of time before it can be deemed a new word, making it the perfect example of a neologism.

Translations 

Because neologisms originate in one language, translations between languages can be difficult.

In the scientific community, where English is the predominant language for published research and studies, like-sounding translations (referred to as 'naturalization') are sometimes used. Alternatively, the English word is used along with a brief explanation of meaning.
The four translation methods are emphasized in order to translate neologisms: transliteration, transcription, the use of analogues, calque or loan translation.

When translating from English to other languages, the naturalization method is most often used. The most common way that professional translators translate neologisms is through the Think aloud protocol (TAP), wherein translators find the most appropriate and natural sounding word through speech. As such, translators can use potential translations in sentences and test them with different structures and syntax. Correct translations from English for specific purposes into other languages is crucial in various industries and legal systems. Inaccurate translations can lead to 'translation asymmetry' or  misunderstandings and miscommunication. Many technical glossaries of English translations exist to combat this issue in the medical, judicial, and technological fields.

Other uses 
In psychiatry and neuroscience, the term neologism is used to describe words that have meaning only to the person who uses them, independent of their common meaning. This can be seen in schizophrenia, where a person may replace a word with a nonsensical one of their own invention (e.g., "I got so angry I picked up a dish and threw it at the geshinker"). The use of neologisms may also be due to aphasia acquired after brain damage resulting from a stroke or head injury.

See also

 Aureation
 Backslang
 Blend word
 Language planning
 Nonce word
 Mondegreen
 Morphology (linguistics)
 Phono-semantic matching
 Portmanteau
 Protologism
 Retronym
 Sniglet
 Syllabic abbreviations
 Word formation

References

External links

Neologisms in Journalistic Text
Interpretation of the Formation of Internet Neologisms 
Fowler, H.W., "The King's English", Chapter I. Vocabulary, Neologism
Algeo, John. Fifty Years among the New Words: A Dictionary of Neologisms, 1941–1991 
Wordspy
Rice University Neologisms Database
Neologisms from the Internet – with Esther Dyson, Jimmy Wales and more... 

 
Lexicology
Terminology